James Gary Gloster (born June 6, 1936) is an American prelate who served as Suffragan Bishop of North Carolina in The Episcopal Church between 1996 and 2007.

Early life and education
Gloster was born on June 6, 1936, in Hopkinsville, Kentucky. He was educated at Wabash College and graduated in 1959. He then studied at the Virginia Theological Seminary and earned his Master of Divinity in 1962. He was awarded a Doctor of Ministry from the Virginia Seminary in 1990.

Career
He was ordained deacon in 1962 and then priest on December 21, 1962. He then became vicar of St Augustine's Church in Danville, Indiana, while in 1966 became program director at Waycross Camp and Conference Centre. In 1968, he became associate rector of the Church of the Redeemer in Cincinnati, Ohio, and in 1972 he transferred to Pulaski, Virginia to serve as rector of Christ Church. Between 1980 and 1988 he served as associate rector of Christ Church in Charlotte, North Carolina, before becoming vicar of the Chapel of Christ the King in Charlotte, North Carolina in 1988.

Bishop
Gloster was elected on the fourth ballot as Suffragan Bishop of North Carolina on March 23, 1996, in a special diocesan convention which was held at St Andrew's Church in Greensboro, North Carolina. He was consecrated on July 27, 1996, by Presiding Bishop Edmond L. Browning, at Duke Chapel. He retired in 2007 and then served at St Mary of the Hills in Blowing Rock, North Carolina.

References

1936 births
Living people
Episcopal Church in North Carolina
Episcopal bishops of North Carolina